Terms such as correlation diagram(s), diagram(s) of correlation, and the like may refer to:
Data visualization, the general process of presenting information visually
Statistical graphics, images depicting statistical information

In chemistry, there are several types of correlation diagrams:
Orgel diagrams, images depicting  energies of electronic terms in transition metal complexes
Tanabe–Sugano diagrams, images depicting energies of spectroscopic states
Walsh diagrams, images depicting orbital energies as a function of bond angle
Woodward–Hoffmann rules#Correlation diagrams, images correlating reactant orbitals to product orbitals

See also

Correlation and dependence
Covariance and correlation
Diagram
Infographics
Molecular structures

Statistical charts and diagrams